Mangfallplatz is an U-Bahn station in Munich on the U1 line of the Munich U-Bahn system.

South of the metro station is the Perlacher Forest, a popular recreational area of Munich. To the northeast are the former US Army McGraw barracks.

See also
List of Munich U-Bahn stations

References

Munich U-Bahn stations
Railway stations in Germany opened in 1997
Buildings and structures completed in 1997